The Best of the Long Ryders is a compilation album by American band the Long Ryders, released on 14 June 2004 by Prima Records. Spanning the Long Ryder's career from 1983 to 1987, the album features 18 tracks from the band's first three studio albums and their debut EP, a 1987 live recording, and three non-album tracks. All tracks have been remastered for this release by Jerome Schmitt and Sid Griffin in April 2004.

Reception 

The album received good reviews from critics. Classic Rock called it a "splendid career overview", Record Collector a "stunning best-of", and Time Out "a rollicking collection of twang and vigour." AllMusic wrote, "while this hardly includes every memorable song the group recorded, their best-known tunes are here ... The Best of the Long Ryders ultimately lives up to its title and is a concise but effective summation of what made them special, and why their music continues to resonate today."

Track listing

Notes
"Capturing the Flag" was recorded live at the Bottom Line in New York City on 7 May 1987
"Masters of War" and "I Can't Hide" were recorded for the abandoned 5 by 5 sessions in February 1985.

Personnel
Credits are adapted from the album liner notes.

The Long Ryders
Sid Griffin – guitar, autoharp, harmonica, vocals
Steve McCarthy – guitar, mandolin, banjo, lap steel guitar, vocals
Greg Sowders – drums
Tom Stevens – bass, vocals (except 10-5-60)
Des Brewer – bass, vocals (10-5-60)
Additional musicians
Gene Clark – vocals on "Ivory Tower"
Dave Pearlman – pedal steel guitar on "(Sweet) Mental Revenge"
Will Glenn – violin on "Masters of War"
Steve Wickham – violin on "If I Were a Bramble and You Were a Rose"
Christine Collister – vocals on "If I Were a Bramble and You Were a Rose"
Debbi Peterson – vocals on "I Want You Bad"
Vicki Peterson – vocals on "I Want You Bad"
Technical
Will Birch – producer (1–3, 8, 10)
Ed Stasium – producer (4–7)
David Van Der Heyden – producer (9)
Henry Lewy – producer (11–14)
Paul McKenna – producer (11–14, 17, 18)
Earle Mankey – producer (15, 16)
The Long Ryders – producer (15–18)
Jerome Schmitt – remastering
Sid Griffin – remastering
Phil Smee – design
Greg Sowders – liner notes
Tom Stevens – liner notes
Pete Frame – booklet family tree

References 

2004 compilation albums
The Long Ryders albums
Albums produced by Henry Lewy
Albums produced by Ed Stasium